Sheikh Isa Abdullah Al Jowder was a Sunni cleric and nationalist political activist in Bahrain. He was a member of the Haq Movement. He was a signatory to both the 1992 and the 1994 petitions calling on the then Amir to reinstate the authority of the 1973 elected parliament (dissolved by Amiri decree in 1975).
He was briefly arrested by the government during the 1990s Uprising. He had previously been arrested for his political activities in 1957, 1963 and 1968.

He died on Saturday, September 24, 2011.

References

External links
 The cleric who engineered petitions from the heart of Galali village, Al Wasat newspaper, 31 May 2006 (Arabic)
 Shaikh Isa al-Jowder: A Cleric and a Nationalist, Al-Waqt newspaper, 6 July 2007 (Arabic)
 We need a Tutu here too
 1992 Petition for Reforms to Amir of Bahrain
 

Bahraini activists
Bahraini dissidents
Bahraini Sunni Muslims
Haq Movement politicians
2011 deaths
Year of birth missing